Desecravity is a technical death metal band formed in 2007 from Tokyo, Japan. The band is signed to Willowtip Records and released their full-length debut album entitled Implicit Obedience on January, 2012 and the second full-length album entitled Orphic Signs on November, 2014.

Members 
Current members
 Yuichi Kudo – drums (2007–present)
 Daisuke Ichiboshi – bass (2011–present)
 Yuya Takeda - guitar (2016–present)

Former members
 Toshihiro Inagaki – bass (2007–2011)
 Keisuke Takagi – guitars (2010-2012)
 Shogo Tokita – vocals, guitars (2012–2016)
 Yujiro Suzuki – vocal, guitar (2007–2010, 2011-2013, 2016–2018)

Timeline

Discography 
Studio albums
 Implicit Obedience (2012)
 Orphic Signs (2014)
 Anathema (2019)

External links
 Official Desecravity Website
 

Musical groups established in 2007
Technical death metal musical groups
Japanese death metal musical groups